Richard Malcolm Marais  is Director of the Cancer Research UK (CRUK) Manchester Institute and Professor of Molecular Oncology at the University of Manchester.

Education
Marais was educated at University College London where he was awarded a Bachelor of Science degree in Genetics and Microbiology in 1985. He completed his postgraduate study at the Ludwig Institute for Cancer Research and was awarded a PhD in 1989 for research on isotypes of the protein kinase C (PKC) enzyme supervised by Peter Parker.

Career and research
Marais's research investigates the biology of melanoma and other cancers in order to deliver better treatment strategies for patients. His studies on B-RAF and cell signalling significantly advanced understanding of melanoma biology and aetiology.  He translated his basic research discoveries into clinical implementation, improving patient outcomes, elucidating mechanisms of drug resistance and developing new drugs against BRAF and other cancer targets.  His research informs innovative clinical trial designs with signal-seeking biomarkers to monitor therapy responses and optimise patient treatment.  His research also highlights the importance of combining sunscreen with other sun avoidance strategies to reduce population melanoma risk.

Marais started his career as a postdoctoral researcher with Richard Treisman at the Imperial Cancer Research Fund (ICRF) in London, where he worked on the oncogene known as c-Fos. This was followed by a period in Chris
Marshall’s laboratory at the Institute of Cancer Research (ICR), after which Marais set up his own laboratory in 1998 before moving to Manchester in 2012.

University of Manchester launched in 2019 an investigation into research misconduct from the Marais laboratory

Awards and honours
With colleagues, Marais received the American Association for Cancer Research (AACR) Team Science Award in 2012 for cancer drug discoveries. He received the Leopold Griffuel Prize  in 2016 and the Outstanding Research Award from the Society for Melanoma Research (SMR) in 2017. He was elected a member of the European Molecular Biology Organization (EMBO) in 2009, a Fellow of the Royal Society (FRS) in 2018, and a Fellow of the Academy of Medical Sciences (FMedSci) in 2008. His citation on election reads: 
Marais was awarded membership of the Academia Europaea (MAE) in 2015.

References

Living people
Members of the European Molecular Biology Organization
Fellows of the Royal Society
Fellows of the Academy of Medical Sciences (United Kingdom)
Year of birth missing (living people)
Academics of the University of Manchester
Alumni of University College London
Alumni of Imperial College London
Cancer researchers
Molecular oncology